Cryptopleurum is a genus of water scavenger beetles in the family Hydrophilidae. There are about 11 described species in Cryptopleurum.

Species
These 11 species belong to the genus Cryptopleurum:
 Cryptopleurum americanum Horn, 1890
 Cryptopleurum cerei Schwarz
 Cryptopleurum crenatum (Kugelann, 1794)
 Cryptopleurum evansi Balfour-Browne, 1945
 Cryptopleurum fusciceps (Régimbart, 1907)
 Cryptopleurum impressum Sharp, 1882
 Cryptopleurum minutum (Fabricius, 1775)
 Cryptopleurum pygmaeum Orchymont, 1913
 Cryptopleurum subtile Sharp, 1884
 Cryptopleurum sulcatum Motschulsky, 1863
 Cryptopleurum vagans LeConte, 1855

References

Further reading

External links

 

Hydrophilidae
Articles created by Qbugbot